George Schmit (17 August 1904 – 27 September 1978) was a Luxembourgian sprinter. He competed in the men's 100 metres at the 1928 Summer Olympics.

References

1904 births
1978 deaths
Athletes (track and field) at the 1928 Summer Olympics
Luxembourgian male sprinters
Olympic athletes of Luxembourg
Place of birth missing